Pickerel River may refer to:

Pickerel River (Ontario), a tributary of the French River system in Ontario,
Pickerel River (Kansas), a tributary of the Arkansas River system in Kansas.